The Plate Trial Stakes is a Canadian Thoroughbred flat horserace for three-Year-Olds, foaled in Canada run annually at Woodbine Racetrack in Toronto, Ontario. Raced in early June, the -mile race on dirt is considered one of the most important prep races for Canada's premier horse race, the Queen's Plate.

Inaugurated in 1944 at the Old Woodbine Race Course as a six furlong sprint race, it was moved to the new Woodbine Racetrack in 1957 following that track's closure. In the first forty-eight years, a total of twenty-two winners of the Plate Trial Stakes went on to win the Queen's Plate. However, in the last sixteen years, no horse has accomplished the feat. Most recently, 2012 Plate Trial winner, River Rush, finished a disappointing 6th in the 2012 running of the Plate.

Hall of Fame jockey Avelino Gomez won this race a record nine times including four in a row from 1964 through 1967.

In 1955, Ace Marine won two versions of the race, one at six furlongs and another at a mile and 70 yards.

Since inception, the Plate Trial has been contested at various distances. In 1955, it was run as two races at the Old Woodbine Race Course. The first race consisted of four divisions and contested at 6 furlongs and the second race was made up of three divisions at 1 mile and 70 yards. In other years the distance was:
 6 furlongs : 1944-1955 at Old Woodbine Race Course
 7 furlongs : 1956 at Old Woodbine Race Course
 8.5 furlongs ( miles) : 1957-1979  Woodbine Racetrack
 9 furlongs ( miles) : since 1980 at Woodbine Racetrack

Records
Time record: (a current distance of  miles)
 1:48.97 - River Rush (2012)

Most wins by an owner:
 12 - E. P. & Winnifred Taylor and/or Windfields Farm:(1949, 1952 (2), 1953, 1954 (2), 1957 (2), 1960, 1963, 1979, 1988)

Most wins by a jockey:
 9 - Avelino Gomez (1955, 1957, 1959, 1960, 1961, 1964, 1965, 1966, 1967)

Most wins by a trainer:
 9 - Gordon J. McCann (1952 (2), 1953, 1954 (2), 1957 (2), 1960, 1963)

Winners of the Plate Trial Stakes since 1987

In 2005 Dance with Ravens won the race but for the first time ever in the history of the Plate Trial, the winner was disqualified.
 In 1991 there was a dead heat for first.

Earlier notable winners 
 Overskate (1978)
 Norcliffe (1976)
 Royal Chocolate (1973)
 Kennedy Road (1971)
 Merger (1968)
 Titled Hero (1966)
 Canebora (1963)
 Lyford Cay (1957)
 Ace Marine (1955)

External links
 The Plate Trial Stakes at Pedigree Query

References

Restricted stakes races in Canada
Flat horse races for three-year-olds
Woodbine Racetrack
Recurring sporting events established in 1944
1944 establishments in Ontario